Henrys Fork may refer to:

 Henrys Fork (Snake River tributary) in Idaho
 Henrys Fork (Green River tributary) in Utah and Wyoming, forming one arm of the Flaming Gorge Reservoir

See also
 Henry Fork (disambiguation)